Below are the mintage figures for the America the Beautiful quarters and America the Beautiful silver bullion coins.

The following mint marks indicate which mint the coin was made at (parentheses indicate a lack of a mint mark):

P = Philadelphia Mint

D = Denver Mint

S = San Francisco Mint

W = West Point Mint

2010 quarters

Hot Springs (Arkansas)

Yellowstone (Wyoming)

Yosemite (California)

Grand Canyon (Arizona)

Mount Hood (Oregon)

2011 quarters

Gettysburg (Pennsylvania)

Glacier (Montana)

Olympic (Washington)

Vicksburg (Mississippi)

Chickasaw (Oklahoma)

2012 quarters

El Yunque (Puerto Rico)

Chaco Culture (New Mexico)

Acadia (Maine)

Hawaii Volcanoes (Hawaii)

Denali (Alaska)

2013 quarters

White Mountain (New Hampshire)

Perry's Victory (Ohio)

Great Basin (Nevada)

Fort McHenry (Maryland)

Mount Rushmore (South Dakota)

2014 quarters

Great Smoky Mountains (Tennessee)

Shenandoah (Virginia)

Arches (Utah)

Great Sand Dunes (Colorado)

Everglades (Florida)

2015 quarters

Homestead (Nebraska)

Kisatchie (Louisiana)

Blue Ridge Parkway (North Carolina)

Bombay Hook (Delaware)

Saratoga (New York)

2016 quarters

Shawnee (Illinois)

Cumberland Gap (Kentucky)

Harpers Ferry (West Virginia)

Theodore Roosevelt (North Dakota)

Fort Moultrie (South Carolina)

2017 quarters

Effigy Mounds (Iowa)

Frederick Douglass (District of Columbia)

Ozark Riverways (Missouri)

Ellis Island (New Jersey)

George Rogers Clark (Indiana)

2018 quarters

Pictured Rocks (Michigan)

Apostle Islands (Wisconsin)

Voyageurs (Minnesota)

Cumberland Island (Georgia)

Block Island (Rhode Island)

2019 quarters

Lowell (Massachusetts)

American Memorial Park (Northern Mariana Islands)

War In The Pacific (Guam)

San Antonio Missions (Texas)

River Of No Return (Idaho)

2020 quarters

National Park (American Samoa)

Weir Farm (Connecticut)

Salt River Bay (U.S. Virgin Islands)

Marsh-Billings-Rockefeller (Vermont)

Tallgrass Prairie (Kansas)

2021 quarters

Tuskegee Airmen (Alabama)

See also 

 United States cent mintage figures
 Lincoln cent mintage figures
 United States nickel mintage figures
 United States quarter mintage figures
 Washington quarter mintage figures
 50 State quarter mintage figures
 Kennedy half dollar mintage figures

References 

Twenty-five-cent coins of the United States